Hiromoto Okubo (大久保 博元, born February 1, 1967) is a former Nippon Professional Baseball catcher. After playing, he turned to managing and coaching. In 2015, Hiromoto was promoted from Rakuten's farm team manager to Tohoku Rakuten Golden Eagles full-time manager. He only lasted one season, however, as he resigned after the team again finished in last place.

References

External links
Career statistics and player information from Baseball-Reference or NPB (in Japanese)

1967 births
Baseball people from Ibaraki Prefecture
Japanese expatriate baseball players in the United States
Living people
Managers of baseball teams in Japan
Nippon Professional Baseball catchers
San Jose Bees players
Seibu Lions players
Tohoku Rakuten Golden Eagles managers
Yomiuri Giants players